Amar Jašarspahić (born 30 December 1990), better known as Amar Gile or only Gile, is Bosnian singer from Kakanj, winner of the seventh season of music competition Zvezde Granda.

Biography 
Gile has been interested in music since his early childhood; his singing talent he inherited from his mother. He is the winner of the regional music competition , where he was outstandingly the best one in his concurrence. Since then he has had a successful career; he regularly fills arenas and clubs all throughout Europe, Australia and America. He went on several tours in the Balkans, Western Europe, Scandinavia, America, and Australia. He is an active philanthropist; he helps the children, the youth and the elderly who are in tough health and material situations. He is a UNICEF ambassador and uses the title to fight for the rights of children in the Balkan region. He finished his first album  in 2013. In 2017 he had great success with songs "Spreman na sve" and "Apokalipsa" (accompanied by an uncut music video).

Discography

Albums 
  (2013)
 ""
 ""
 ""
 ""
 ""
 ""
 ""
 ""
 ""

Singles 
 "" (2015)
 "" (2015)
 "" (2016)
 "" (2016)
 "" (2017)
 "" (2017)
 "" (duet with Jelena Kostov) (2018)
 "" (2018)
 "" (2019)
 "" (2019)
 "" (duet with Ivana Selakov) (2020)

Accolades 

 Zvezde Granda Winner (2013)
 The discovery of the decade – Sarajevo (2013)
 Popularity Oscar – Singer of the year (2013)
 Gold Ladybug for best foreign singer in Macedonia (2014)
 Reward for the humanist of the year (2014)
 UNICEF title of the Ambassador of Good Will for BiH (2015)
 Reward in Zagreb for humanitarian work (2015)
 Reward in Skopje for humanity (2015)
 Reward in Skopje for best singer (2015)
 Reward "Davorin Popović" for best young singer (2015)
 UNICEF Ambassador – BiH, region of the Balkans and International representative (2015)
 Platinum plate – album Čovjek tvoga sna (2015)
 Humanity award for "Taking measures for education" (2015)
 Nation idol (Education builds BiH) (2015)
 Honorary citizen of Kakanj city (for promotion of the city and for the humanitarian work) (2015)

References

External links 
 

1990 births
Musicians from Zenica
People from Kakanj
21st-century Bosnia and Herzegovina male singers
Bosnia and Herzegovina folk-pop singers
Living people